Rhizopogon villosulus is an ectomycorrhizal fungus used as a soil inoculant in agriculture and horticulture. It was first described scientifically by mycologist Sanford Myron Zeller in 1941.

References

Rhizopogonaceae
Fungi described in 1941